The Intelligence of Dogs is a 1994 book on dog intelligence by Stanley Coren, a professor of canine psychology at the University of British Columbia. The book explains Coren's theories about the differences in intelligence between various breeds of dogs. Coren published a second edition in 2006.

Coren defines three aspects of dog intelligence in the book: instinctive intelligence, adaptive intelligence, and working and obedience intelligence. Instinctive intelligence refers to a dog's ability to perform the tasks it was bred for, such as herding, pointing, fetching, guarding, or supplying companionship. Adaptive intelligence refers to a dog's ability to solve problems on its own. Working and obedience intelligence refers to a dog's ability to learn from humans.

Methods

The book's ranking focuses on working and obedience intelligence. Coren sent evaluation requests to American Kennel Club and Canadian Kennel Club obedience trial judges, asking them to rank breeds by performance, and received 199 responses, representing about 50 percent of obedience judges then working in North America. Assessments were limited to breeds receiving at least 100 judge responses. This methodology aimed to eliminate the excessive weight that might result from a simple tabulation of obedience degrees by breed. Its use of expert opinion followed precedent.

Coren found substantial agreement in the judges' rankings of working and obedience intelligence, with Border collies consistently named in the top ten and Afghan Hounds consistently named in the lowest. The highest ranked dogs in this category were Border collies, Poodles, German Shepherds, Golden Retrievers, and Doberman Pinschers.

Dogs that are not breeds recognized by the American Kennel Club or Canadian Kennel Club (such as the Jack Russell Terrier) were not included in Coren's rankings.

Evaluation
Coren's book presents a ranked list of breed intelligence, based on a survey of 208 dog obedience judges across North America. When it was first published there was much media attention and commentary in terms of both pros and cons. Over the years, Coren's ranking of breeds and methodology have come to be accepted as a valid description of the differences among dog breeds in terms of their trainability. A 2009 measurement of canine intelligence using another method confirmed the general pattern of these rankings, and Coren included an updated study using owner ratings of dog trainability and intelligence in the 2006 edition of the book.

The value of survey-based cognition findings have been dismissed by some cognitive researchers and dog trainers.

The 1995 edition of Coren's book lists 130 dog breeds, and assigns them to 79 ranks with some ties, grouped into six descending categories.

See also
 List of dog breeds

References

Dog training and behavior
Animal intelligence
1994 non-fiction books
Books about dogs
Natural history books